Jimmy McKnight (9 August 1923 – 1 January 1999) was an  Australian rules footballer who played with South Melbourne in the Victorian Football League (VFL).

Notes

External links 

1923 births
1999 deaths
Australian rules footballers from Victoria (Australia)
Sydney Swans players